is a passenger railway station in located in the city of  Tsu, Mie Prefecture, Japan, operated by Central Japan Railway Company (JR Tōkai).

Lines
Ishinden Station is served by the Kisei Main Line, and is 12.1 rail kilometers from the terminus of the line at Kameyama Station.

Station layout
The station consists of two opposed side platforms connected by a footbridge.

Platforms

Adjacent stations

|-
!colspan=5|Central Japan Railway Company (JR Central)

History
Ishinden Station opened on August 21, 1891, as a station on the Tsu spur line of the privately owned Kansai Railway. The line was nationalized on October 1, 1907, becoming the Sangu Line of the Japanese Government Railways (JGR) on October 12, 1909. The current station building was completed in December 1923. The station was transferred to the control of the Japan National Railways (JNR) Kisei Main Line on July 15, 1959. The station was absorbed into the JR Central network upon the privatization of the JNR on April 1, 1987. The station has been unattended since October 1, 2011.

Passenger statistics
In fiscal 2019, the station was used by an average of 1272 passengers daily (boarding passengers only).

Surrounding area
Takadahonzan Senshu-ji 
Takada Junior College
Takada Junior and Senior High School
Tsu City Ichimitsu Tanaka Junior High School
Isshinden Elementary School

See also
 List of railway stations in Japan

References

External links

  JR Central timetable 

Railway stations in Japan opened in 1891
Railway stations in Mie Prefecture
Tsu, Mie